The Town of Hudson is a  home rule municipality in Weld County, Colorado, United States.  The population was 2,356 at the 2010 census.

A post office called Hudson has been in operation since 1883. The town derives its name from the town company, Hudson City Land and Improvement Co.

Geography
Hudson is located at  (40.072582, -104.639890).

Demographics

As of the census of 2000, there were 1,565 people, 485 households, and 388 families residing in the town. The racial makeup of the town was 79.68% White, 0.89% African American, 1.21% Native American, 0.51% Asian, 14.95% from other races, and 2.75% from two or more races. Hispanic or Latino of any race were 25.43% of the population.

There were 485 households, out of which 49.3% had children under the age of 18 living with them, 66.6% were married couples living together, 7.6% had a female householder with no husband present, and 19.8% were non-families. 15.7% of all households were made up of individuals, and 2.7% had someone living alone who was 65 years of age or older.  The average household size was 3.23 and the average family size was 3.64.

In the town, the population was spread out, with 36.4% under the age of 18, 8.4% from 18 to 24, 33.2% from 25 to 44, 17.1% from 45 to 64, and 4.9% who were 65 years of age or older.  The median age was 29 years. For every 100 females, there were 106.5 males.  For every 100 females age 18 and over, there were 111.7 males.

The median income for a household in the town was $45,673, and the median income for a family was $48,393. Males had a median income of $36,108 versus $23,088 for females. The per capita income for the town was $15,613.  About 6.9% of families and 11.7% of the population were below the poverty line, including 13.9% of those under age 18 and none of those age 65 or over.

References

External links
Town of Hudson website
CDOT map of the Town of Hudson

Towns in Colorado
Towns in Weld County, Colorado